Phosphatidylinositol 3-kinase regulatory subunit beta is an enzyme that in humans is encoded by the PIK3R2 gene.

A recent study on gene expression indicated that the PIK3R2 gene might have a key role in pan-cancer prognosis.

Interactions 

PIK3R2 has been shown to interact with:
 CRKL 
 Cbl gene, 
 Epidermal growth factor, 
 FYN, 
 HER2/neu, 
 Macrophage colony-stimulating factor, and
 PIK3CD.

Clinical relevance 

PIK3R2 mutations were recently shown to be associated with polymicrogyria.

References

Further reading